Kamienna Góra  is a town in south-western Poland with 19,010 inhabitants (2019). It is the seat of Kamienna Góra County, and also of the rural district called Gmina Kamienna Góra, although it is not part of the territory of the latter (the town forms a separate urban gmina).

Kamienna Góra on the Bóbr river is situated in Lower Silesian Voivodeship (from 1975–1998 it was in the former Jelenia Góra Voivodeship) between the Stone Mountains and the Rudawy Janowickie at the old trade route from Silesia to Prague, today part of the National Road No. 5.

History

The area was part of the Great Moravian Empire in the Early Middle Ages, and became part of the emerging Polish state in the 10th century under its first ruler Mieszko I of Poland. During the times of the fragmentation of Poland it was part of the duchies of Silesia, Legnica, Jawor and Świdnica. In the early 13th century, Polish Duke Henry the Bearded erected a defensive castle at the site, due to its proximity to the Polish–Czech border. The settlement was mentioned in documents from 1232 (as Landeshut) and 1249 (as Landishute and Landishute forensis auch Camena Gora). In 1254 the Piast Duke Bolesław II the Bald of Legnica gave the area to the Benedictine monastery of Opatovice (in eastern Bohemia), who already had established the Krzeszów Abbey at nearby Krzeszów. When the abbey passed to the Cistercians in 1289, Kamienna Góra was acquired by Duke Bolko I the Strict of Świdnica, who extended it as a stronghold against the nearby Kingdom of Bohemia and granted town rights in 1292. It received new privileges from Duke Bolko II the Small in 1334. Nevertheless, the duchy fell to the Bohemian crown with Bolko's death in 1368. It burnt down during the 1426 Hussite campaign to Silesia and in the 1460s it passed to the Kingdom of Hungary, before in 1490 it fell back to Bohemia, then under the rule of Vladislaus II, who erected new town walls.

During the Thirty Years' War the town was plundered by Austrian and Swedish troops. As a result of the war, only two residents remained in the town in 1639. After Frederick II of Prussia had conquered Silesia with Landeshut in 1742, his fierce opponent Maria Theresa of Austria once again struck back in the course of the Seven Years' War. In 1760 Austrian troops under the command of field marshal Laudon invaded the province and on June 23 defeated a Prussian corps under Heinrich August de la Motte Fouqué at the Battle of Landeshut.

The town was not destroyed during World War I and II, but during the latter, the Germans established and operated a subcamp of the Gross-Rosen concentration camp. Around 1,600 men, mostly Poles, and also smaller groups of other ethnicities, were imprisoned and used as forced labour in the subcamp, and many of them died. There was also a forced labour camp for Jews. It was captured by the Soviets on May 9, 1945, and after the war it became again part of Poland. According to the Potsdam Agreement the German populace was expelled and the town was repopulated by Poles, expellees from former eastern Poland annexed by the Soviet Union and settlers from central Poland. Initially renamed to the 19th-century Polish name Kamieniogóra, in 1946 the name Kamienna Góra, which was first recorded in 1249, was adopted.

Sights
The main historic district of Kamienna Góra is the Old Town (Stare Miasto) with the Freedom (Plac Wolności), Grunwald Squares (Plac Grunwaldzki) and Brewery (Plac Browarowy) Squares, filled with numerous historic buildings. Among the historic sights of Kamienna Góra are:
 Gothic churches of Saints Peter and Paul and Corpus Christi
 Baroque Church of Our Lady of the Rosary
 Town Hall
 Weaving Museum (Muzeum Tkactwa)
 Lower Silesian Rehabilitation Center (Dolnośląskie Centrum Rehabilitacji)
 Culture Centre (Centrum Kultury)
 ZUS office
 preserved medieval town walls
 ruins of the Grodztwo Castle
 numerous historic townhouses and buildings, incl. the train station, tax office, high school, courthouse, etc.

There are also several monuments dedicated to the victims of the local branch of the Nazi German Gross-Rosen concentration camp.

Gallery

Notable people
 Walter Arndt (1891–1944), zoologist
 Gosia Dobrowolska (born 1958), actress
 Rudolf Hamburger (1903–1980), architect and spy
 Viktor Hamburger (1900–2001), biologist
 Carl Gotthard Langhans  (1732–1808), architect, designer of the Brandenburg Gate

Twin towns – sister cities

Kamienna Góra is twinned with:

 Bitterfeld-Wolfen, Germany
 Dvůr Králové nad Labem, Czech Republic
 Ikast-Brande, Denmark
 Trutnov, Czech Republic
 Vierzon, France
 Wolfenbüttel, Germany

References

External links

Official town website
 Jewish Community in Kamienna Góra on Virtual Shtetl
Satellite photo from Google Maps
News from local area

Cities and towns in Lower Silesian Voivodeship
Kamienna Góra County
Cities in Silesia